Jüri Müür (born 7 January 1929, Tartu – 17 November 1984) is an Estonian film director, screenwriter and actor.

In 1960 he graduated from Gerasimov Institute of Cinematography.

Filmography

 1961: Ühe küla mehed (feature film; director)
 1964: Põrgupõhja uus Vanapagan (feature film; director)
 1968: Inimesed sõdurisinelis (feature film; director)
 1977: Reigi õpetaja (feature film; director)

References

1929 births
1984 deaths
Estonian film directors
Estonian screenwriters
Estonian male film actors
20th-century Estonian male actors
People from Tartu
20th-century screenwriters
Burials at Pärnamäe Cemetery